Mark Kenny is an Australian journalist. He was the national affairs editor for The Age and the Sydney Morning Herald, and is now a Professor at the Australian Studies Institute at the Australian National University.

Career and personal life

Kenny is a correspondent for Fairfax Media, and formerly worked for ABC, for the Advertiser as the national political editor, and was the national affairs editor for The Age and the Sydney Morning Herald. He is director of Canberra's National Press Club, and regular commentator on the ABC's Insiders program. Kenny is the cousin of political commentator and Sky News Live presenter Chris Kenny.

In December 2018, it was announced that Kenny was taking up a position of senior fellow at the Australian Studies Institute at the Australian National University on the strength of his media output. Kenny was promoted to Professor in February 2020. 

His recent publications include the chapter, 'Coarse and Effect: Normalised anger online as an essential precondition to violence' in the ANU Press book: 'Rethinking Social Media and Extremism'. 

Kenny currently hosts the podcast "Democracy Sausage with Mark Kenny".

Political views

Kenny worked for the Labor Party in South Australia. He is a republican, who describes CHOGM meetings as "quaint". He advocated for marriage equality.

References

Living people
Year of birth missing (living people)
Australian correspondents
Australian political journalists
The Sydney Morning Herald people